Grković is a Serbian surname, derived from the word grk meaning "Greek". The family name is found all over former Yugoslavia, historically in villages such as Bestrima, Kaoci, Srednja Gora, Orahovac etc. It may refer to:

Jovan Grković-Gapon (1879-1912), former Serbian Orthodox monk turned guerrilla fighter
Milica Grković, Serbian onomastician
Trajko Grković (1919-1943), Yugoslav partisan
Jovo Grković, Yugoslav partisan
Radovan Grković (1913—1974), Yugoslav partisan
Dušan Grković, Yugoslav partisan
Branko Grković

Serbian surnames